Charles Francis McDevitt (January 5, 1932 – May 29, 2021) was an American attorney, politician, and jurist.  He was a justice of the Idaho Supreme Court from 1989 to 1997, serving as chief justice from 1993 to 1997.

Early life and education 
Born in Pocatello, Idaho, he received his Bachelor of Laws from the University of Idaho College of Law in 1956.

Career 
McDevitt practiced law in Boise and was general counsel for Boise Cascade from 1962 to 1968. In 1962, he was elected to the Idaho House of Representatives and was re-elected in 1964. He left the legislature in 1966 to become president of Beck Industries in New York City. He also worked as an executive at the Singer Corporation before returning to Boise, where he joined the Ada County Prosecutor's Office as a trial attorney.

In August 1989, McDevitt was appointed to the Idaho Supreme Court by Governor Cecil Andrus; the seat was vacated by the death of Allan Shepard in May.

Following his retirement from the court in 1997, McDevitt served on an ethics panel convened by the state legislature.

Death 
McDevitt died in Boise in 2021 at the age of 89.

References

1932 births
2021 deaths
People from Pocatello, Idaho
University of Idaho College of Law alumni
Members of the Idaho House of Representatives
Justices of the Idaho Supreme Court